The 2017 Latvian Higher League is the 26th season of top-tier football in Latvia. Spartaks Jūrmala are the defending champions, having won their first title in the previous season.

Teams

The bottom-placed team from the 2016 season, BFC Daugavpils,  were directly relegated to the 2017 Latvian First League. They were replaced by Babīte, champions of the 2016 Latvian First League.

The seventh-placed team from the 2016 season, FS METTA/LU, retained their top-flight spot for the 2017 season by defeating 2016 First League runners-up, AFA Olaine in the play-offs.

Babīte was removed from the league on 22 June 2017 after the Latvian Football Federation received a notice from UEFA's Betting Fraud Detection System for 6 separate games involving Babīte. All the results for Babīte games were invalidated and do not count for the standings.

Source: Scoresway

Kits manufacturer and sponsors

League table

Results
Each team will play the other seven teams home-and-away twice, for a total of 28 games each.

Relegation play-offs
The seventh-placed side faced the runners-up of the 2017 Latvian First League in a two-legged play-off, with the winner being awarded a spot in the 2018 Higher League competition.

Season statistics

Top scorers

References

External links
 

Latvian Higher League seasons
1
Latvia
Latvia